The 1941 Georgia Teachers Blue Tide football team represented the Georgia Teachers College—now known as Georgia Southern University—during the 1941 college football season. The team was led by Crook Smith, in his 13th and final year as head coach. Due to the outbreak of World War II, the football program was suspended after this season and was not revived until 1982.

Schedule

References

Georgia Teachers
Georgia Southern Eagles football seasons
Georgia Teachers Blue Tide football